Philip Bester and Vasek Pospisil were the defending champions but decided not to participate.

Érik Chvojka and Peter Polansky won the title, defeating Adam El Mihdawy and Ante Pavić 6–4, 6–3 in the final.

Seeds
The top two seeds received a bye into the quarterfinals.

  Maxime Authom /  Lukáš Lacko (semifinals)
  Hiroki Kondo /  Yasutaka Uchiyama (quarterfinals)
  Érik Chvojka /  Peter Polansky (champion)
  Duilio Beretta /  José Hernández (quarterfinals)

Draw

Draw

References
 Main Draw

Challenger Banque Nationale de Granby
Challenger de Granby